McFadden and Whitehead were an American R&B duo, best known for their signature tune "Ain't No Stoppin' Us Now". They wrote and produced some of the most popular R&B hits of the 1970s, and were primarily associated with the Gamble and Huff record label, Philadelphia International Records.

Early career
As teenagers, Gene McFadden and John Whitehead met at school in 1960s Philadelphia and formed a group called The Epsilons. The personnel included Allen Beatty, James Knight, and future Blue Notes member Lloyd Parks.  When Otis Redding came to Philadelphia, The Epsilons were invited to become part of his revue. They toured with him during the late 1960s until Redding's death in a plane crash in 1967. They signed a small record deal with Stax Records on the back of this opportunity and had a moderate success in 1970 with "The Echo". 

After the departure of Lloyd Parks to Harold Melvin & the Blue Notes, Gene and John changed their name to Talk of the Town and worked with Gamble/Huff who groomed their talents on their North Bay label. Discovering their abilities for writing and producing, Kenny Gamble and Leon Huff employed McFadden & Whitehead at their Philadelphia International Records (PIR) label through the 1970s, collaborating with them at first on 'I'll Always Love My Mama' for The Intruders. While at the label, their songs and/or productions were utilised by the O'Jays on their hit "Back Stabbers" in 1972 (which reached #3 on the Billboard Hot 100 and #1 on Billboard's Hot Soul Singles chart) and Archie Bell & the Drells for hits "Let's Groove", "The Soul City Walk", "Strategy" and "Don't Let Love Get You Down".

McFadden and Whitehead also wrote songs such as "Bad Luck", "Wake Up Everybody", "Prayin'" (on the Source label) and "Where Are All My Friends" for Harold Melvin & The Blue Notes, as well as "The More I Get, The More I Want", and "Cold, Cold World" for Teddy Pendergrass as well as "Just Got To Be More Careful" for Carolyn Crawford. A number of these songs were written in collaboration with their associate Victor Carstaphen. 

The production team also worked with fellow producer Rahni Song and with artists Melba Moore, Freddie Jackson, Gloria Gaynor, Gladys Knight, The Jackson 5, James Brown, Stevie Wonder, Lou Rawls, Willie Collins, Jerry Bell and Beau Williams.

Rise to stardom
McFadden and Whitehead formed together as a group officially under the name "McFadden & Whitehead" in 1977. The pinnacle of their success came in 1979 with dancefloor anthem "Ain't No Stoppin' Us Now", from their eponymously named album, which went to #1 on the R&B charts, #13 on the pop charts, sold eight million records worldwide and was nominated for a Grammy Award. (Two more versions of the song were released back-to-back in 1981 - The Philadelphia Phillies version and The Philadelphia Eagles version, on the label's T.S.O.P. subsidiary). After leaving PIR, they re-recorded "Ain't No Stoppin' Us Now" as "Ain't No Stoppin' (Ain't No Way)" for the Sutra label in New York (1984) and worked on some individual projects. The duo was featured on The Oprah Winfrey Show, where they sang their most famous song on an episode in which Oprah featured the top hits of the 1970s.

Hits co-written/produced by McFadden & Whitehead include:
 "Back Stabbers" (the O'Jays)
 "Bad Luck" (Harold Melvin & the Blue Notes)
 "Wake Up Everybody" (Harold Melvin & the Blue Notes)
 "Where Are All My Friends" (Harold Melvin & the Blue Notes)
 "I'll Always Love My Mama" (The Intruders)
 "Let's Groove" (Archie Bell & the Drells)
 "The Strength of One Man" (The Jacksons)
 "I Don't Want To Lose Your Love" (Freddie Jackson)
 "Standing Right Here" (Melba Moore)
 "Pick me Up, I'll Dance" (Melba Moore)
 "Let's Stand Together" (Melba Moore)
 "Let's Mend What's Been Broken" (Gloria Gaynor)
 "Determination" (Willie Collins)
 "I Got the Love" (McFadden & Whitehead)
 "You're My Somebody to Love" (McFadden & Whitehead)
 "I've Been Pushed Aside" (McFadden & Whitehead)
 "Got to Change" (McFadden & Whitehead)
 "Do You Want to Dance?" (McFadden & Whitehead)
 "Just Wanna Love You Baby" (McFadden & Whitehead)
 "Mr. Music" (McFadden & Whitehead)
 "This Is My Song" (McFadden & Whitehead)
 "All the Man You Need" (Jerry Bell)

According to the American Top 40 radio program for the week ended August 4, 1979, Casey Kasem reported that McFadden and Whitehead were in Chicago on May 25, 1979, promoting their music and doing various interviews. Because they agreed to do one more music interview at the last minute, they decided to reschedule their flight to Los Angeles to the next day, May 26. They were originally scheduled to fly on American Airlines Flight 191 on May 25, which crashed shortly after takeoff from O'Hare International Airport, killing all 258 passengers plus the crew.

Deaths
On May 11, 2004, Whitehead was murdered on the street outside of his Philadelphia home studio, while standing aside as a young man made repairs on his SUV. There, he was shot once by one of several unknown gunmen, who then fled. The case remains unsolved. Whitehead was 55 years old.

On January 27, 2006, McFadden died of liver and lung cancer. He was 56.

Discography

Studio albums

Compilation albums
Ain't No Stoppin' Us Now: The Best of the PIR Years (2004, Edsel UK)

Singles

References

External links

McFadden and Whitehead at PhillySoulClassics.com
McFadden and Whitehead Remembered

American disco groups
Disco duos
Rhythm and blues duos
Philadelphia International Records artists
Musical groups from Philadelphia
Record production duos
American soul musical groups
American songwriting teams
American musical duos